Norley is a former locality in the Shire of Bulloo, Queensland, Australia.

On 17 April 2020 the Queensland Government reorganised the nine localities in the Shire, resulting in six localities. This included the discontinuation of Norley, absorbing all of its land into an enlarged Thargomindah.

Geography 
Norley was part of the Channel Country, a network of interconnecting creeks and rivers that are normally dry except during seasonal flooding. The land was used for low density cattle grazing.

The Bundeena Road entered the locality from the west and exited to the south to neighbouring Thargomindah. The Quilpie Thargomindah Road entered the locality from the north-east and exited to the south to Thargomindah.

History 
The locality of Norley took its name from its county and parish of the same name. The county name takes its name in turn from the Norley pastoral station.

On 17 April 2020 the Queensland Government reorganised the nine localities in the Shire, resulting in six localities. This included the discontinuation of Norley, absorbing all of its land into an enlarged Thargomindah.

References

External links 

Shire of Bulloo
Localities in Queensland